Spits (stylized as Sp!ts) was a tabloid format newspaper freely distributed in trains, trams and buses in the Netherlands from 1999 to 2014. Its competitor was Metro.

References

1999 establishments in the Netherlands
2014 disestablishments in the Netherlands
Defunct newspapers published in the Netherlands
Dutch-language newspapers
Mass media in Amsterdam
Daily newspapers published in the Netherlands
Publications disestablished in 2014
Publications established in 1999